The Royal Hibernian Marine School, also known for a period as Mountjoy & Marine School, was a charity school in Dublin, Ireland established in 1766 to care for and educate the orphaned children of seamen. The school's building on Sir John Rogerson's Quay was in use as a school from 1773 until 1904 and continued to be used as offices and storage until the 1970s before being demolished in 1979.

School

History
The first meeting of the board of the school took place on 6 June 1766 in the then operating Custom House on what was at that time named Custom House Quay (now Wellington Quay).

In 1775, the school obtained a royal charter.

The school building was damaged by fire in 1872 causing damage and resulting in the school moving premises. In 1900 it was situated on Upper Merrion Street while in 1904, the school moved to Seafield Road in Clontarf, where the Seacourt estate now stands.

The school amalgamated with Mountjoy School in 1968 and became Mountjoy & Marine School. Mountjoy School was a protestant boarding school previously located on Mountjoy Square which had moved to a new premises in Clontarf in 1947.

The school later amalgamated with Bertrand and Rutland School to finally become Mount Temple Comprehensive School in 1972.

Sport
In 1910, the school won the inaugural Leinster Cricket Union Junior cup. Teams representing the school also won the competition on a number of other occasions.

New building
The school originally operated from a leased coach-house and inn building near the junction of Ringsend and Irishtown named 'The Sign of the Merrion'.

In 1769, the governors of the school leased a plot of land on Sir John Rogerson's Quay from Luke Gardiner for a term of £70 per annum. From various sources including parliament and private doners, the governors of the school managed to raise enough funds to construct the new building between 1770-73. It was one of the first large buildings to be constructed on the recently completed quay.

One of the school wings operated as a chapel while the other operated as a school room with the main building housing the children.

Most sources attribute the building's design to the architect Thomas Cooley, while others attribute it to Thomas Ivory. 

An image of the building standing on the quay features in James Malton's illustrations titled A Picturesque and Descriptive View of the City of Dublin drawn in about 1790 not long after the building was erected.

The building operated as the offices of the B&I Line for a number of years as well as the offices of a cold storage company before being demolished in 1979.

References

Buildings and structures in Dublin (city)
Educational institutions established in 1766
Former Secondary schools in Dublin (city)